Old Bolsover is a civil parish in the Bolsover District of Derbyshire, England.  The parish contains 55 listed buildings that are recorded in the National Heritage List for England.  Of these, one is listed at Grade I, the highest of the three grades, six are at Grade II*, the middle grade, and the others are at Grade II, the lowest grade.  The parish contains the market town of Bolsover and the surrounding area, including the village of Shuttlewood.  The older part of the town has been a market town since the medieval period,   and the area of New Bolsover is a model village built between 1888 and 1893 for colliery workers.  A row of six semi-detached houses was built for the managers, over 200 houses were built for the other workers in terraces forming three sides of a quadrangle, and community buildings were also erected.  All these buildings are listed.  The most prominent building in the parish is Bolsover Castle, a country house in the style of a castle, which is listed, together with associated structures, including five conduit houses.  Most of the other listed buildings are houses, cottages, shops and associated structures, farmhouses and farm buildings.  The rest include a church, a chapel, a former windmill and a nearby chimney, a war memorial, a school and a telephone kiosk.


Key

Buildings

References

Citations

Sources

 

Lists of listed buildings in Derbyshire
Listed